Henry C. Dudley (1813–1894), known also as Henry Dudley, was an English-born North American architect, known for his Gothic Revival churches.  He was a founding member of the American Institute of Architects and designed a large number of churches, among them Saint Paul's Episcopal Cathedral in Syracuse, New York, built in 1884, and Trinity Church (Elmira, New York), completed in 1858.

Career
He partnered with architect Frank Wills, whom he knew from their days working together in Exeter, England for John Hayward, and worked on a number of churches with him.  After Wills' sudden death in April 1857, Dudley is believed to have completed the Episcopal Church of the Nativity (Huntsville, Alabama), which is now a National Historic Landmark.  He also worked on his own and with Frederick Diaper.

Prominent works
Many of Dudley's works are listed on the National Register of Historic Places (NRHP).
Buildings designed by Dudley include:
Carlheim, located north of Leesburg, Virginia on U.S. 15, NRHP-listed
Church of the Holy Trinity and Rectory, 381 Main St. and 144 Broad St., Middletown, Connecticut, NRHP-listed
Episcopal Church of the Nativity, 212 Eustis St., Huntsville, Alabama, NRHP-listed
Grace Church (Episcopal,) 14 Boltwood Avenue, Amherst, Massachusetts, contributing property in an NRHP-listed historic district
Park-McCullough House, 1 Park St. North Bennington, Vermont, NRHP-listed
St. George's Church, Flushing, New York, NRHP-listed
St. James' Episcopal Church and Parish House, 2500 Jerome Ave. Bronx, New York, NRHP-listed
St. John's Episcopal Church (Montgomery, Alabama), 113 Madison Ave. Montgomery, Alabama, NRHP-listed
St. John's Episcopal Church, in the Downtown Waterbury Historic District, Waterbury, Connecticut, contributing property in an NRHP-listed historic district
St. John's Episcopal Church and Rectory, 15 St. John's St., Monticello, New York, NRHP-listed
St. Mark's Episcopal Church, Main St., Hoosick Falls, New York, NRHP-listed
St. Paul's Cathedral and Parish House, 310 Montgomery St., Syracuse, New York, NRHP-listed
St. Peter's Episcopal Church Complex, 169 Genesee St., Auburn, New York, NRHP-listed
St. Peter's Episcopal Church (Niagara Falls, New York)
Trinity Episcopal Church, 1900 Dauphin St., Mobile, Alabama, NRHP-listed
Trinity Church (Elmira, New York), 304 N. Main St., Elmira, New York, NRHP-listed
Trinity Church Lansingburgh, 585 Fourth Ave., Troy, New York, NRHP-listed
Trinity Episcopal Church Complex, 335 Fourth Ave., Mount Vernon, New York, NRHP-listed
Trinity Episcopal Church, contributing property in what is now the NRHP-listed Tariffville Historic District, in Tariffville, Connecticut.
one or more buildings in NRHP-listed West Main Street-West James Street Historic District, in Richfield Springs, New York
Christ Episcopal Church, in Red Wing, Minnesota, named by the National Trust for Historic Preservation to its 2008 distinctive destinations list.

Two churches believed to be the work of Wills and Dudley will likely have had increased involvement by Dudley, due to their completion after Will's death:
 Church of the Nativity (Union, South Carolina), 1856–59
 Trinity Church (Natchitoches, Louisiana), 1857–1860

Gallery

References

External links

 Henry C Dudley papers in process. Held by the Department of Drawings & Archives, Avery Architectural & Fine Arts Library, Columbia University.

1813 births
1894 deaths
Gothic Revival architects
American ecclesiastical architects
Architects of cathedrals
Founder of American Institute of Architects
19th-century American architects
British emigrants to the United States